I, a Man is a 1967 American erotic drama film written, directed and filmed by Andy Warhol. It debuted at the Hudson Theatre in New York City on August 25, 1967. The film depicts the main character, played by Tom Baker, in a series of sexual encounters with eight women. Warhol created the movie as a response to the popular erotic Scandinavian film I, a Woman, which had opened in the United States in October 1966.

Cast
The film featured several of Warhol Superstars from his studio The Factory:
 Tom Baker as Tom
 Cynthia May as Girl in Kitchen
 Nico as Girl with TV
 Ingrid Superstar as Girl on Table
 Stephanie Graves as Girl in Penthouse
 Valerie Solanas as Girl on Staircase
 Bettina Coffin as Last Girl
 Ultra Violet
 Ivy Nicholson

Warhol gave Solanas a part in the film for $25 and as compensation for a script she had given to Warhol called Up Your Ass, which he had lost. Solanas later attempted to kill Warhol by shooting him. According to a 2004 biography of Jim Morrison, Morrison agreed to appear in the film opposite Nico, but later backed out of it and instead sent his friend Tom Baker to the production shoot.

Reception
Roger Ebert of the Chicago Sun Times wrote the film was "not dirty, or even funny, or even anything but a very long and pointless home movie", and described it as "an elaborate, deliberately boring joke". Howard Thompson in his review for the New York Times wrote: "The nudity is no match for the bareness of the dialogue's drivel and the dogged tone of waste and ennui that pervade the entire film".

See also
 Andy Warhol filmography
 Blue Movie
 List of American films of 1967
 New Andy Warhol Garrick Theatre

References

External links
 

1967 films
1960s erotic drama films
Films directed by Andy Warhol
American erotic drama films
1967 drama films
1960s English-language films
1960s American films